This is a list of authors who have written poetry in the Uzbek language.

 Abdulla Oripov
 Abdulla Qodiriy
 Choʻlpon
 Erkin Vohidov
 Furqat
 Gʻafur Gʻulom
 Halima Xudoyberdiyeva
 Hamid Olimjon
 Hamza Hakimzade Niyazi
 Ilyas Malayev
 Mirtemir
 Nodira
 Shukrullo
 Zulfiya

See also 
 List of Uzbek-language writers

Uzbek
Lists of Uzbekistani people